Spark is the official student newspaper of the Victorian College of the Arts Student Union. It is published four times per year and is free to all Victorian College of the Arts students.

See also
 List of student newspapers
 Student newspaper

References

ja:オーストラリアの学生新聞